All of Us Are Dead  is a South Korean manhwa series written and illustrated by Joo Dong-geun. This webtoon was released on internet portal Naver WEBTOON from May 13, 2009 to November 2, 2011 with a total 130 chapters. Adapted into the live-action series, the story is about a group of high-schoolers surviving the zombie apocalypse in their school.

Adaptation
In April 2020, the news of the production of a Netflix original series was announced, and director Lee Jae-gyu is in charge of directing it.

In July 2020, an official report came out that the final casting of the five main students who will lead the play has been confirmed. They are Yoon Chan-young as Lee Cheong-san, Park Ji-hu as Nam On-jo, Cho Yi-hyun as Choi Nam-ra, Lomon as Lee Su-hyeok, and Yoo In-soo as Yoon Gwi-nam.

References

External links
 All of Us Are Dead (Korean) at Naver
 All of Us Are Dead (English) at Line Webtoon

2009 webtoon debuts
South Korean webtoons
Horror webtoons
School webtoons